Ganesh Mylvaganam (born 1 August 1966) is a former Sri Lankan-born cricketer who played for the United Arab Emirates national cricket team. He played three One Day Internationals for United Arab Emirates, all in 1996 World Cup. He scored 36 runs at an average of 12.00. Before the world cup, in mid 1990s he was a batting member of UAE squad in associate and affiliate tournaments. He is now settled in Australia.

External links

1966 births
Living people
Emirati cricketers
United Arab Emirates One Day International cricketers
Cricketers from Colombo
Sri Lankan emigrants to the United Arab Emirates
Sri Lankan expatriate sportspeople in the United Arab Emirates